Elizabeth Amsden (March 27, 1881, Boston – July 20, 1966, Sugar Hill, New Hampshire) was an American operatic soprano and actress. She had an active international opera career during the early 20th century. She also appeared in several small to mid-sized roles in Hollywood films between 1923 and 1946; appearing in a total of 35 motion pictures.

Life and career
Amsden was born in Boston, Massachusetts, but during her school days her family moved to Providence, Rhode Island, where she was educated at the Elmhurst School. In 1892 she entered the International School for singers in Boston where she studied under William Whitney. She then went to Paris where she remained for six years before making her professional debut at London's Royal Opera House in 1910. Following engagements in Nice and Brussels, she became a member of the Boston Opera Company in 1911 where her roles included Minnie in La fanciulla del West and the title role in Aida.

She sang with the Century Opera Company and toured the United States with the San Carlo Opera Company. Her first marriage to French-Canadian baritone Joseph Royer ended in divorce. Her second marriage, to New York Post music critic and sports writer Charles P. Sawyer, ended with his death in 1935. She later married Gabriel Chaminadas who survived her upon her death in 1966.

References

American operatic sopranos
1881 births
1966 deaths
Musicians from Boston
Musicians from Providence, Rhode Island
American film actresses
20th-century American actresses
Actors from Providence, Rhode Island
Singers from Rhode Island
Singers from Massachusetts
Actresses from Boston
20th-century American women opera singers
Classical musicians from Massachusetts
Actresses from Rhode Island